Tunis-Socialiste was a French language daily evening newspaper published in Tunis, Tunisia. It was the organ of Tunisian Federation of the SFIO. The newspaper was founded in March 1921 after the communists had split away from the SFIO and taken the publication l'Avenir sociale with them. Tunis-Socialiste carried the byline "for the brotherhood of the races". The initial editorial team of the paper consisted of Albert Cattan, André Duran-Angliviel, Joachim Durel and the Fichet couple. The paper ceased publication in 1956.

References

1921 establishments in Tunisia
Defunct newspapers published in Tunisia
French-language newspapers published in Tunisia
French Section of the Workers' International
Mass media in Tunis
Newspapers established in 1921
Publications disestablished in 1956
Socialist newspapers